Vengur  is a village in Tiruchirappalli taluk of Tiruchirappalli district in Tamil Nadu, India.

Demographics 

As per the 2001 census, Vengur had a population of 1,256 with 620 males and 636 females. The sex ratio was 1026 and the literacy rate, 84.33.

References 

 

Villages in Tiruchirappalli district